Shibuya Scramble Square (Japanese: 渋谷スクランブルスクエア Shibuya Sukuranburu Sukuea) is a mixed-use skyscraper connected to Shibuya Station in Shibuya, Tokyo, Japan. 

It is part of a redevelopment of the station area. Located above Shibuya Station, the complex consists of three buildings, including an eastern building, Shibuya Scramble Square (229.71 m height), a central building (61 m height) and a western building (76 m height). 
Construction of the complex began in 2014 and is due to end in 2027, with an area of 276,000 m2. The eastern building of the complex, the Shibuya Scramble Square skyscraper, was completed in October 2019 and opened on November 1, 2019, with an area of 181,000 m2. Shibuya Scramble Square surpassed the Cerulean Tower in height and became the highest skyscraper in the district of Shibuya. The Shibuya Scramble Square underground floor is directly connected to Shibuya Station. An observation deck, “SHIBUYA SKY”, is located on the roof of the skyscraper. The complex includes shops, offices, an observation deck, and a parking area.

The name "Shibuya Scramble Square" comes from the infamous pedestrian crossing located just few meters from the landmark, "The Scramble". This is the busiest pedestrian crossing in the world as people can walk in every direction, making it quick and accessible to reach every building near by Shibuya station.

Gallery

References

External links
SHIBUYA SCRAMBLE SQUARE

Skyscraper office buildings in Tokyo